Davis Promontory is a low promontory, completely snow-covered, near the northeastern end of the Havola Escarpment. This promontory which faces southward was occupied by the United States Antarctic Research Program Horlick Mountains Traverse party, 1960–61. It was named by the Advisory Committee on Antarctic Names for Walter L. Davis, Chief Construction Mechanic, U.S. Navy, who wintered over at Ellsworth Station, 1957, and Byrd Station, 1960. Davis was a member of the 11 man tractor party, led by Major Antero Havola, that journeyed from Byrd Station to South Pole Station, 1960–61. On December 25, 1960, the party passed a few miles northward of this promontory.

References
 

Promontories of Antarctica
Landforms of Ellsworth Land